Rajur is a town in Latur district of Maharashtra state of India. Ahmedpur is 60 km away from district headquarter Latur.

Demography
Ahmedpur old name is rajur
 

Ahmedpur has population of 23,936 of which 12,796 are males while 11,140 are females as per report released by Census India 2011.

Female Sex Ratio is of 927 against Maharashtra state average of 929. Literacy rate of Ahmedpur city is 82.67% higher than state average of 82.34%. In Ahmedpur, Male literacy is around 88.33% while female literacy rate is 76.61%.

Schedule Caste (SC) constitutes 14.84% while Schedule Tribe (ST) were 1.27% of total population in Ahmedpur.

Government and politics
Ahmedpur comes under Latur (Lok Sabha constituency) for Indian general elections and current member of Parliament representing this constituency is Sudhakar Shringare of Bhartiya Janata Party.

Ahmedpur comes under Ahmedpur (Vidhan Sabha constituency) for assembly elections of Maharashtra. Current representative from this constituency in Maharashtra state assembly is Babasaheb Mohanrao Patil .

See also

 Shirur Tajband, major village in Ahmedpur taluka

References

Cities and towns in Latur district